Erruca cardinale is a moth of the family Erebidae and described by George Hampson in 1898. It is found in Brazil. While São Paulo was where E. cardinale was first encountered, this moth is also found in other parts of Brazil like Santa Catarina, specifically in the towns of Bom Jardim da Serra, Brusque, Joinville and São Bento do Sul. Erruca cardinale is described as a day-flying moth, meaning that unlike most species of moth it is active during the day and sleeps at night. In volume one of the Catalogue of the Lepidoptera Phalaenae (1898) E. cardinale is described as follows:

References

Moths described in 1898
Moths of South America